The Orchestre Symphonique Kimbanguiste (OSK), or Kimbanguist Symphony Orchestra, is a Congolese orchestra based in Kinshasa, Democratic Republic of the Congo. For many years, the OSK was the only orchestra known to reside in Central Africa, though in recent times, the Kaposoka Orchestra began performing in Angola. It was the world's only all-black orchestra.

History
Conductor Armand Diangienda founded the orchestra in 1994 after losing his job as an airline pilot, naming it after his grandfather, religious leader Simon Kimbangu. At its conception, the group had only twelve amateur musicians that shared instruments and often used common materials as makeshift instrument parts. The group eventually grew to the size of about 200 amateur musicians and performers consisting of a full orchestra and choir.

The orchestra gained international attention when German filmmakers Martin Baer and Claus Wischmann created the documentary Kinshasa Symphony (2010) depicting the plight of the orchestra and its members in poverty stricken Kinshasa.

In May 2013 it was announced that Diangienda was to become an honorary member of the Royal Philharmonic Society, an award previously bestowed on such famous musicians as Mendelssohn, Rossini, Wagner, Brahms and Stravinsky.

References

External links
 Orchestre Symphonique Kimbanguiste official website

Democratic Republic of the Congo musical groups
African orchestras
Musical groups established in 1994
1994 establishments in Zaire
Culture of Kinshasa